Manzoor Akhtar (born April 16, 1968 in Karachi, Sindh) is a former Pakistani cricketer who played seven ODIs between 1997 and 1998.

International awards

One-Day International Cricket

Man of the Match awards

References 

1968 births
Living people
Pakistan One Day International cricketers
Pakistani cricketers
Karachi Whites cricketers
Karachi Blues cricketers
Allied Bank Limited cricketers
Karachi cricketers
Islamabad cricketers
Biman Bangladesh Airlines cricketers
Cricketers from Karachi